Rhacophorus exechopygus is a species of frog in the family Rhacophoridae. It is found in the Central Highlands of Vietnam and in the adjacent Annamite Range in Laos. Its range may extend into northeastern Cambodia where suitable habitat should be present. The specific name exechopygus is derived from the Greek words exechos (=jutting out) and pygos (=buttocks), referring to the infra-anal projection characteristic of this frog. Its common names are spinybottom tree frog and Tramlap flying tree frog.

Description
The overall appearance is stocky. There is a strong, wide, white-edged, horizontal infra-anal dermal projection. The snout is pointed. The tympanum is distinct. The fingers have well-developed discs and extensive webbing. The toe discs are smaller than those of fingers; the toes are fully webbed. The dorsum is uniformly gray to brown above, but sometimes with obscure dark blotch at rear of head. The limbs have brown or reddish brown crossbars.

Habitat and conservation
The eggs are deposited in foam nests attached to leaves overhanging the water surface. It is threatened by habitat loss and degradation, mainly caused by agriculture. Collection for international pet trade might also be a threat. It is present in a number of protected areas including the Phong Nha-Kẻ Bàng National Park and Ngọc Linh and Song Thanh Nature Reserves (Vietnam). Its expected range includes other protected areas too.

References

exechopygus
Frogs of Asia
Amphibians of Laos
Amphibians of Vietnam
Amphibians described in 1999
Taxa named by Ilya Darevsky
Taxa named by Robert F. Inger
Taxa named by Nikolai Loutseranovitch Orlov
Taxonomy articles created by Polbot